Zenopsis is a genus of dories, a group of marine fish. There are four extant species, but the genus is also known from fossils dating back to the Oligocene epoch. They largely resemble the better-known John Dory, and are typically found in relatively deep water, below normal scuba diving depth.

Species
There are currently four recognized recent species in this genus:
 Zenopsis conchifer (R. T. Lowe, 1852) (sometimes misspelled Z. conchifera) (Silvery John dory)
 Zenopsis nebulosa (Temminck & Schlegel, 1845) (mirror dory)
 Zenopsis oblongus Parin, 1989
 Zenopsis stabilispinosa Nakabo, D. J. Bray & Yamada, 2006

References

Zeidae
Prehistoric ray-finned fish genera
Extant Rupelian first appearances
Rupelian genus first appearances